Morgan Thomas Powell (born 27 March 2003) is a Welsh professional footballer who currently plays for Hong Kong Premier League club HKFC.

Career statistics

Club

Notes

References

External links
 Yau Yee Football League profile

Living people
2003 births
Hong Kong people of Welsh descent
Hong Kong footballers
Hong Kong youth international footballers
Welsh footballers
Association football midfielders
Hong Kong Premier League players
Hong Kong FC players